Albert Gallatin Blakey House is a historic home located at Boonville, Cooper County, Missouri. It was built about 1900, and is a -story, Queen Anne style brick dwelling. It has a two-story, rectangular brick addition with flat, parapeted roof and a two-story frame porch added about 1910.

It was listed on the National Register of Historic Places in 1990.

References

Houses on the National Register of Historic Places in Missouri
Queen Anne architecture in Missouri
Houses completed in 1900
Houses in Cooper County, Missouri
National Register of Historic Places in Cooper County, Missouri
1900 establishments in Missouri
Boonville, Missouri